Associação Atlética Moreninhas, commonly known as Moreninhas, is a men's and women's Brazilian football team based in Campo Grande, Mato Grosso do Sul state. The women's team competed in the Copa do Brasil de Futebol Feminino once.

History
The club was founded on 5 March 1994.

Women's team
Moreninhas competed in the Copa do Brasil de Futebol Feminino in 2008, when they were eliminated in the Second Round by Aliança.

Stadium
Associação Atlética Moreninhas play their home games at Estádio Jacques da Luz, nicknamed Estádio das Moreninhas and Estádio Toca do Leão. The stadium has a maximum capacity of 4,500 people.

References

Association football clubs established in 1994
Football clubs in Mato Grosso do Sul
Women's football clubs in Brazil
1994 establishments in Brazil